Diocese of Worcester may refer to:

Anglican Diocese of Worcester, England
Roman Catholic Diocese of Worcester, Massachusetts. U.S.A.